Deanefield is an unincorporated community and coal town located in Ohio County, Kentucky, United States.

The Deanefield post office was originally known as Aetnaville, before the name was changed to Deanefield in 1910.

References

Unincorporated communities in Ohio County, Kentucky
Unincorporated communities in Kentucky
Coal towns in Kentucky